Ndaweni Mahlangu was the former Premier of Mpumalanga in South Africa.

References

Year of birth missing (living people)
Living people
Government ministers of South Africa
Premiers of Mpumalanga
Members of the Mpumalanga Provincial Legislature